Alexander Kravchenko (born 1955) is a Russian cognitive linguist and professor at Baikal National University of Economics and Law (BNUEL), where he heads the Department of Foreign Languages. He is one of the founding researchers of the Distributed Language Group.

Biography
Alexander Kravchenko received his Ph.D. in English linguistics from St-Petersburg State University in 1987 and his Ph.D. Habilitat from the Institute of Linguistics of the Russian Academy of Sciences in 1995 with the thesis Principles of a Theory of Indexicality.

Prior to taking his position at BNUEL in 2000, he spent 22 years teaching English as a second or foreign language and Linguistics courses at a linguistics university, where he also headed the Cognitive Linguistics Lab from 1995 to 2000. His research interests include biology of cognition, biocognitive philosophy of language, biosemiotics, cognitive grammar, applied cognitive linguistics (teaching English as a second or foreign language).

Publications
Kravchenko published several monographs and edited volumes and over 80 articles in Russian and English.

Books
 1996. Jazyk i vosprijatije: Kognitivnyje aspekty jazykovoj kategorizatsii. Irkutsk University Press. (Language and Perception: Cognitive aspects of linguistic categorization). 2ne edition in 2004.
 2003. Sign, Meaning, Knowledge: An essay in the cognitive philosophy of language. Peter Lang.
 2006 (Editor). Studia linguistica cognitiva. Vol. 1.  Jazyk i poznanije: Metodologicheskie problemy i perspectivy. Moscow: Gnosis.
 2008.  Biology of Cognition and Linguistic Analysis: From non-realist linguistics to a realistic language science. Peter lang.
 2008. Kognitivnyj gorizont jazykoznanija.Irkutsk:  Izdatelstvo BGUEP. (The Cognitive Horizon of Linguistics. BNUEL Press)
 2009 (Editor). Studia linguistica cognitiva. Vol. 2. Nauka o jazyke v izmeniajushcheisia paradigm znanija. Irkutsk: Izdatelstvo BGUEP (Language sciuence in the changing knowledge paradigm. BNUEL Press)

Articles
 2001. Russian verbs of spatial orientation STAND, SIT, LIE. In E. Nemeth (Ed.), Cognition in Language Use: Selected Papers from the 7th International Pragmatics Conference, Vol. 1. Antwerp: International Pragmatics Association,  216–225.
 2002.  The cognitive roots of gender in Russian. Glossos, 3.
 2002. A cognitive account of tense and aspect: resurrecting "dead" metaphors. Anglophonia. French Journal of English Studies 12. 199–212.
 2003. The ontology of signs as linguistic and non-linguistic entities: a cognitive perspective. Annual Review of Cognitive Linguistics 1. John Benjamins, 179–191.
 2004.  A new cognitive framework for Russian aspect. F. Karlsson (ed.). Proceedings of the 20th Scandinavian Conference of Linguistics, Helsinki, January 7–9. University of Helsinki, Department of General Linguistics, Publications No. 36.
 2005. Complex sentence as a structure for representing knowledge. In K. Turewicz (ed.). Cognitive linguistics—a user friendly approach. University of Szczecin Publishing House,  49–63.
 2006. Cognitive linguistics, biology of cognition, and biosemiotics: bridging the gaps. Language Sciences 28(1), 51–75.
 2007. “Everything said is said by an observer": the cognitive distinction between the infinitive/participle clausal arguments. In J.-R. Lapaire, G. Desagulier, J.-B. Guignard (eds.), From Gram to Mind : Grammar as cognition. PUB- Presses Universitaires de Bordeaux, France,  267–284.
 2007. Essential properties of language, or why language is not a code. Language Sciences 29(5). 650–671.
 2007. Whence the autonomy? A reply to Harnad and Dror. Pragmatics & Cognition 15(3),  587–597.
 2009. Reassessing the project of linguistics. In J. Zlatev, M. Andrén, M. J. Falck, and C. Lundmark (Eds.), Studies in Language and Cognition. Newcastle upon Tyne: Cambridge Scholars Publishing, 27–42. 
 2009. Speech, writing, and cognition: the rise of communicative dysfunction. In W. Oleksy and P. Stalmaszczyk (eds.), Cognitive Approaches to Language and Linguistic Data. Studies in honor of Barbara Lewandowska-Tomaszczyk. Frankfurt/Main: Peter Lang.
 2009. The experiential basis of speech and writing as different cognitive domains. Pragmatics & Cognition 17(3),  527–548.
 2009. Language and mind: A bio-cognitive view. In H. Götzsche (ed.), Memory, Mind and Language. Newcastle upon Tyne: Cambridge Scholars Publishing, 103–124.
 2010. Native speakers, mother tongues, and other objects of wonder. Language Sciences, 2010 (to appear)

References

Linguists
Living people
1955 births
Academic staff of the Baykalsky State University of Economics and Law